Alessandro Arrigoni (died 1674) was a Roman Catholic prelate who served as Bishop of Mantua (1713–1718).

Biography
Alessandro Arrigoni was born in Mantua, Italy on 24 August 1674.
On 30 January 1713, he was appointed during the papacy of Pope Clement XI as Bishop of Mantua.
On 5 February 1713, he was consecrated bishop by Ferdinando d'Adda, Cardinal-Priest of Santa Balbina, with Vincenzo Petra, Titular Archbishop of Damascus, and Antonio San Felice, Bishop of Nardò, serving as co-consecrators. 
He served as Bishop of Mantua until his death on 13 August 1718.

References

External links and additional sources
 (for Chronology of Bishops) 
 (for Chronology of Bishops) 

18th-century Italian Roman Catholic bishops
Bishops appointed by Pope Clement XI
Bishops of Mantua
1674 births
1718 deaths